Adam Sabra is Professor of History and King Abdul Aziz Ibn Saud Chair in Islamic Studies at the University of California, Santa Barbara.

Early life
Sabra received his Ph.D. from Princeton University in 1998.

Career
Adam Sabra is professor and King Abdul Aziz Ibn Saud Chair in Islamic Studies at the University of California.

Selected publications
Poverty and Charity in Medieval Islam: Mamluk Egypt, 1250-1517. Cambridge: Cambridge University Press, 2000 (paperback edition)
With Roxani Eleni Margariti and Petra M. Sijpesteijn (eds.), Histories of the Middle East: Studies in Middle Eastern Society, Economy and Law in Honor of A. L. Udovitch. Leiden: Brill, 2010.
With Richard J. McGregor (eds.), Le développement du soufisme en Égypte à l’époque mamlouke. Cairo: Institut Français d'Archéologie Orientale, 2006.
“Ibn Hazm’s Literalism: A Critique of Islamic Legal Theory,” in al-Qantara, XXVIII/1 (enero-junio 2007), pp. 7–40, XXVIII/2 (julio-diciembre 2007), pp. 307–348.
The Guidebook for Gullible Jurists and Mendicants to the Conditions for Befriendig Emirs and, The Abbreviated Guidebook for Gullible Jurists and Mendicants to the Conditions for Befriendig Emirs by ‘Abd al-Wahhāb ibn Aḥmad ‘Alī al-Sha‘rānī

References 

Year of birth missing (living people)
Living people
21st-century American historians
21st-century American male writers
University of California, Santa Barbara faculty
American historians of Islam
Princeton University alumni
American male non-fiction writers